Haldia Petrochemicals Ltd., often referred to as HPL, is one of the largest petrochemical companies in India, with a total capacity equivalent to 10,00,000 TPA of ethylene.  It was formed out of a joint venture between the Government of West Bengal, The Chatterjee Group, TATA Group and The Indian Oil Corporation in 1994. Commercial Production started in 2001. The factory complex is located 125 km from Kolkata, at Haldia, in the Purba Medinipur district of West Bengal, India.

The Corporate office is located in Kolkata, West Bengal. Address:
Haldia Petrochemicals Limited
(West Bengal), Eco Intelligent Park, Tower 1, Block EM, Plot No 3, Sector V, Salt Lake;
PO: Bidhan Nagar, District: North 24 Parganas, Kolkata 700091, West Bengal.

HPL is a naphtha based petrochemical complex with the capacity to process more than 3,50,000 TPA of polymers.

Its main products are Linear Low Density Polyethylene (LLDPE), High Density Polyethylene (HDPE), Polypropylene (PP), Benzene, Butadiene, Cyclopentane, C4 Hydrogenated (LPG), Pyrolysis Gasoline (Py Gas), Carbon Black Feedstock (CBFS) and Motor-Spirit, MTBE and Butene-1.

History 
 
1985  Incorporated as a public limited company
1992  Environmental Clearance of the project received   
1994  MOU signed between WBIDC, Chatterjee Fund Management, Soros Fund Management & Tata group of   companies for implementation of HPL Complex through a joint venture co. 
1996  Land Acquisition completed    
1997  Project construction started                                            
2000  Project Commissioned. Trial production started                                          
2003  Corporate Debt Restructuring (CDR) Approved                                                      
2004  Reported PAT for the first time. Turnover exceeded US$1 Billion                                                           
2005  Capacity enhanced by 25%    
2007  Turnover exceeded US$2 Billion. Reported maximum PAT since inception   
2009  HPLCL buyout and management control                                           
2010  Completion of project Supermax

References

External links
 

Petrochemical companies of India
Oil and gas companies of India
Companies based in West Bengal
Non-renewable resource companies established in 1985
1985 establishments in West Bengal
Indian companies established in 1985